Shali is the name of two inhabited localities in Russia.

Shali, Chechen Republic, a town in Shalinsky District of the Chechen Republic
Shali, Republic of Tatarstan, a rural selo in Pestrechinsky District of the Republic of Tatarstan